In 2008, Kent County Cricket Club competed in Division One of the County Championship, the South-East Division of the 50-over Friends Provident Trophy, Division Two of the NatWest Pro40 and the South Division of the Twenty20 Cup. Kent also hosted a three-day first-class match against the touring New Zealanders and a three-day match without first-class status against Leeds/Bradford UCCE, both at the St Lawrence Ground.

Kent were relegated from Division One of the County Championship, finishing second from bottom. They performed more strongly in limited overs cricket, finishing fourth in Division Two of the NatWest Pro40 and reaching the final of both the Twenty20 Cup and the Friends Provident Trophy, where they were defeated by Middlesex and Essex, respectively. Kent had been the defending champions in the Twenty20 Cup.

Squad
Former Pakistan international all-rounder Azhar Mahmood signed a contract with Kent in November 2007 and, having recently applied for British citizenship, he would not count as an overseas player. South African all-rounder Justin Kemp, who played for Kent in 2005 and 2006, re-signed for the county on a two-year deal in February as a Kolpak player.

Left-arm spinner Min Patel announced his retirement in February, ending a 19-year career with Kent that included two Test caps for England and a total of 630 first-class wickets.

Neil Dexter signed for Essex on a one-month load in June and this was subsequently extended. After becoming frustrated at a lack of first XI opportunities, Dexter turned down a new contract at the end of the season and went on to sign for Middlesex.

Batsman Matt Walker was released in September after 20 years with Kent, and having made his first-team debut in 1992. Walker went on to sign for Essex. The 2008 season would also be the second and last with Kent for Yasir Arafat, before he re-signed for Sussex.

Squad list
 Ages given as of the first day of the County Championship season, 16 April 2008.

County Championship

Division One

Matches

Other first-class match

Tour match

Friends Provident Trophy

South-East Division

Matches

Quarter-finals

Semi-finals

Final

NatWest Pro40

Division Two

Matches

Twenty20 Cup

South Division

Matches

Quarter-finals

Semi-finals

Final

UCCE match
Kent's 3-day match against Leeds/Bradford UCCE in April did not have first-class status.

Statistics

Batting

Bowling

References

External links
Kent home at ESPN cricinfo
Kent County Cricket Club official site

2008
2008 in English cricket